Breadwinners is an American animated television series created by Gary "Doodles" DiRaffaele and Steve Borst and developed by Bill Braudis for Nickelodeon.

The series was originally conceived as an animated short from DiRaffaele's efficiency apartment in Studio City, Los Angeles along with Borst. The two had previously met in Burbank while working on an animated series, Mad, in 2013. Originally a one-off short, Breadwinners premiered at a short film festival held at a bar in New York City, and later was linked to the network, where they were contacted and the show was developed into a full-fledged series, which premiered on February 17, 2014. After the series was cancelled in 2016, the show continued to air reruns on Nicktoons until December 3, 2020. The series is about two anthropomorphic flightless green ducks named SwaySway and Buhdeuce.

Plot
Two anthropomorphic, flightless green ducks named SwaySway (Robbie Daymond) and Buhdeuce (Eric Bauza), who are best friends, fly around the water-based planet Pondgea in a rocket-powered van delivering bread to the citizens. SwaySway, tall, thin and green, is the leader of the duo, and although he does not always use the best judgment, he is quite skilled at flying the van. Buhdeuce, short, round and green, is klutzier, but is also an enthusiastic and a loyal assistant to SwaySway. Often, when they get in over their heads, they will "level up," or transform (in a similar vein to video game characters) into a variety of forms they need to solve their problems.

Episodes

Characters

Main
 SwaySway (voiced by Robbie Daymond) – An anthropomorphic cayuga duck who comes from a line of bread delivery ducks. SwaySway pilots the rocket van with his best friend (or "best bap"), Buhdeuce. He is in love with a nonspeaking duck named Jenny Quackles. His signature move is "party punch," where his fist enlarges prior to launching off his arm and deflating once it hits its target.
 Buhdeuce (voiced by Eric Bauza) – An anthropomorphic cayuga duck who is SwaySway's best friend and navigator in bread delivery. Buhdeuce is depicted as scatterbrained and inattentive. His signature moves are his "booty kick", where he kicks with his rear end, and "six-pack punch", where a fist comes out of his chest and punches. Buhdeuce's catchphrases are "Yep! Yep!" and "Aw, bubble nuggets!".

Supporting
 Jelly (voiced by Alexander Polinsky) – The Breadwinners' female pet frog who fetches, pants and drools like a dog. She can only say "Ribbit!" and lived with Buhdeuce before he met SwaySway and became a Breadwinner. Jelly enjoys eating insects.
 The Bread Maker (voiced by Fred Tatasciore) – A legendary figure who lives in the bread mines and can be summoned via rubbing a magical toaster. He is T-Midi's idol and claims to be made entirely of different bread types. SwaySway and Buhdeuce visit him whenever they are in need of advice or assistance.
 Ketta (voiced by Kari Wahlgren) – An energetic anthropomorphic swan and master mechanic who runs her own "auto tune-up" business. The Breadwinners go to her when they need upgrades or repairs to the rocket van. Her catchphrase is "Aw, lugnuts!".
 T-Midi (voiced by S. Scott Bullock) – An anthropomorphic owl who is the Breadwinners' best customer. He speaks with a British accent and wears a tuxedo. The Breadwinners frequently get on his nerves despite being loyal to each other. He is a huge fan of the Bread Maker. T-Midi spends much of his time taking care of his mother, who is a living portrait he calls "Mumsie".
 Officer Rambamboo (voiced by Audrey Wasilewski) – A yellow anthropomorphic toad and the chief of the Tadpolice. She teaches driving classes, and has been depicted as strict and impatient. She finds SwaySway and Buhduece to be annoying most of the time, as they rarely follow the rules of the road when driving the rocket van.
 Oonski the Great (voiced by Nolan North) – An anthropomorphic beaver and he is a viking who has been depicted as an enemy to the public. His motto is "Eat, beat, steal!" and will do anything to steal anything. He speaks in the third person.
 Mr. Pumpers (voiced by Michael-Leon Wooley) – A manly anthropomorphic stork who loves money more than anything. He is the owner of Pumpers' Diner. He created several schemes to earn money in the show, and got rich every time. Mr. Pumpers' uniform is a blue hat with a bird wing on top, and an apron. His catch phrase is "Boom-yummy!".

Production
Breadwinners was created by Gary "Doodles" DiRaffaele and Steve Borst. It was conceived as a four-and-a-half-minute animated short from DiRaffaele's efficiency apartment in Studio City, Los Angeles (dubbed the "Doodle Chamber"). The two had previously met in Burbank while working on an animated series, Mad, in 2012. The protagonists, originally unnamed, were drawn by DiRaffaele as part of a collaboration with Borst. Both were drawn tossing a piece of bread up in the air; DiRaffaele explained that the premise came as an extension of his appetite for bread, a staple of meals from his Italian-American upbringing, with friends sometimes calling him a "duck". The latter responded positively to the drawing, saying that he could produce something from it.

The short was written by Borst and produced by DiRaffaele in Adobe Flash Professional over the course of two months. Daymond, who provides the voice of SwaySway, was found on a casting call website and invited into the apartment of DiRaffaele to audition. Originally a one-off, Breadwinners premiered at the Midsummer Night Toons short film festival in New York City, where they wanted to entertain their colleagues. The short was uploaded to YouTube with positive reception, and after obtaining 10,000 to 15,000 views on its first week, Borst explained, "it just took on a life of its own." The creators sent it to Nickelodeon after users expressed wanting more. Upon receiving an inquiry from a Nickelodeon executive, DiRaffaele was doubtful of the offer, joking that he "thought it was spam". After several months, the creators were hired to expand the short into a full-fledged series.

Actions in the series play out metronomically—that is, episodes are built around an underlying soundtrack, scored by Tommy Sica (who used to play in a band with DiRaffaele) and recorded before the animation phase. This process entails events in the show unfolding at a faster rate than most animated series like it. Test audiences composed of children were shown to "bounce" accordingly to the beat. Animation is outsourced to Canada through a Titmouse, Inc. studio in Vancouver; like the short, it is also produced in Adobe Animate. A cartoony look was explicitly chosen as the art style, DiRaffaele noted, which gave way to elements such as dark, heavy outlines around the characters. In addition, retro-style video games were the inspiration for the art direction, with a pixel texture applied to backgrounds and the character's shadows.

Broadcast and reception
The series premiered on  February 17, 2014, as a "sneak beak" on Nickelodeon, followed by a regular broadcast on February 22, 2014. It had been ordered for a 20-episode first season a year prior. Its original broadcast garnered roughly 2.8 million viewers, ranking 81st of the top 100 cable shows for adults aged 18 to 49. The network announced a month later in a press release that the show had risen as the top-rated show for kids aged two to eleven, averaging 1.7 million viewers and a Nielsen rating of 5.3. A second season, also consisting of 20 episodes, was announced in May 2014. Episodes that premiered after 2015 were broadcast on Nicktoons.

In Canada, the series premiered on YTV on March 8, 2014. In the United Kingdom and Ireland, Nicktoons started airing it on September 22, 2014. In Australia, Nickelodeon premiered the series on November 1, 2014.

Upon its series premiere, Breadwinners received negative reviews from critics and audiences alike; common criticisms included the show's extensive usage of toilet humor, poor visual style, and dull episode plots.

Emily Ashby of Common Sense Media assessed its reliance on toilet humor as questionable while giving credit to the strength of the protagonists' friendship. She enjoyed the bread-related puns sometimes uttered by characters but acknowledged that "they're not likely to strike the same chord of hilarity with your kids." New York Daily News writer David Hinckley linked its style of humor as enticing to its target demographic. He ultimately stated that it "sprinkles in a few grownup jokes, particularly bread-related puns, but it aims mostly at the younger set."

Writing for the Los Angeles Times, Robert Lloyd found its visual style oddly pleasant and identified a slew of potential influences and references. While he saw the humor as "loud and often gross," the result was "basically genial." Tori Michel of About.com dubbed its use of mixed media interesting, yet headache-inducing for parents. While she called the concept and the characters "definitely original," she stressed that its crude humor may call for avoiding it altogether for some parents. Tom Conroy of Media Life Magazine wrote poorly of the show, finding it unfunny throughout. He specified its "noisy and violent" content as too much for little kids as well as being "too stupid for big kids."

Home media

DVD releases

Explanatory notes

References

External links

 
 
 

2010s American animated television series
2010s Nickelodeon original programming
2014 American television series debuts
2016 American television series endings
American children's animated comedy television series
American flash animated television series
English-language television shows
Nicktoons
Animated television series about ducks